Thulagi Chuli is a mountain in Mansiri Himal, a high subrange of the Himalayas in north-central Nepal.

Location 

The southward-flowing Thulagi Glacier separates the Thulagi Chuli from Manaslu,  to the northeast and the Ngadi Chuli,  to the east.

Climbing history 
Mountaineers from Russia named Aleksander Gukov, Ivan Dozhdev, Valeriy Shamalo, and Ruslan Kirichenko successfully scaled Thulagi Chuli for the first time in September of 2015.

References 

Gandaki Zone
Seven-thousanders of the Himalayas